, alternately romanized as Whampoa, is one of 11 urban districts of the prefecture-level city of Guangzhou, the capital of Guangdong Province, China. Despite its name, it does not include Huangpu Island (now Pazhou) or its famous anchorage. Huangpu absorbed Guangzhou's former Luogang District in 2014. The district has been awarded the status of "Happiest District of China" in 2020.

History
During the Canton trade, Changzhou was known as "Dane's Island" and used by Danish crews for repairs and burials. It lay on the eastern side of the Huangpu or "Whampoa" anchorage, named for Huangpu Island (now Pazhou in Haizhu District). The Whampoa Military Academy was founded on Changzhou in 1924.

Huangpu district played an important role in China's economic development. Originally called "Guangzhou Development District", it was one of the first economic and technological development districts in China.

On 12 February 2014, Luogang District was dissolved by China's central government and its area added to Huangpu.

According to historical records, the family of one of the first two Chinese to immigrate to Germany in 1821/22 originally came from Huangpu. In an 1822 essay for the magazine Isis, Lorenz Oken described the two Chinese immigrants as "Aßing von Heong San, Aho von Wong Bu". As Rainer Schwarz argues, "Wong Bu" refers to the old transliteration "Whampoa", which means the family of Aho (whose actual name appears to have been FENG Yaxue) originated from the area that is today Huangpu District.

Administrative divisions

Economy
Huangpu District is the major innovation carrier for the Greater Bay Area which aims to make Guangzhou China’s national core city and an integrated gateway. It will cultivate as a technological, educational, and cultural center, and develop as an international metropolis. 

In 2021, Huangpu District achieved a gross regional product (GDP) of RMB 415.837 billion (US$ 61.3 billion), up 8.2% year-on-year, with a two-year average growth rate of 6.1%. The value added of the primary industry was RMB 470 million (US$ 70 million), up 19.3% year-on-year; the value added of the secondary industry was RMB 246.816 billion (US$ 36,38 billion), up 7.2% year-on-year; and the value added of the tertiary industry was RMB 168.550 billion (US$ 24,85 billion), up 9.6% year-on-year. 2021, Huangpu District's GDP per capita was RMB 337,100 (US$ 49,690), up 10.0% year-on-year, higher than the city's average of RMB 186,700 (US$ 27,523) This is 2.2 times higher than the city's average. 

Huangpu district is one of the developing industrial districts in Guangzhou. According to a 2020 study by Deloitte, the district is already especially competitive in the industries of automobiles, electronics, energy, high-end chemicals, food and beverage, and electrical machinery. Emerging industries in the district include ICT, intelligent equipment, biomedicine, new energy, new materials, and services.

Huangpu district is at the heart of the Greater Bay Area (GBA) and is home to a large development area, which is considered one of China's most important economic centres. It is producing a regional GDP of US$49.3 billion and the district received a fixed asset investment of US$19.68 billion in 2019. The development district contributes 43% to Guangzhou's industrial output value and 70% of its high-tech product output value.

Huangpu district is an important area for international trade and investment. In 2019, the district recorded the highest volumes in exports and imports among the districts of Guangzhou, with an export volume of US$24.766 billion and an import volume of US$19.878 billion. Foreign investment in actual use for Huangpu district was US$2.28 billion the same year, prompting it to rank first among all development districts within China.

Moreover, Huangpu is home to the Guangzhou IP Court, offering reliable and effective intellectual property (IP) right protection to every company and institution invested. It also provides newcomers and those looking for expansion with a fast approval and application process. Founding and registering a new company or branch is possible within one day. The rapid procedure is also referred to as Huangpu Speed.

Industry Sectors 
The division between primary, secondary and tertiary sectors has shifted since 2015. Back then, the tertiary sector accounted for 29.1% of Huangpu District's GDP, while the secondary sector accounted for 70.6% and the primary sector for only 0.3%. In 2019, the tertiary sector accounted for 35.7% of Huangpu District's GDP, with the secondary sector accounting for 64.1% and the primary sector having fallen to 0.2%. Thus, although the share of the tertiary sector has been growing, the dominating industry in Huangpu is still the secondary industry.

The dominance of the secondary sector can also be seen from the growing industrial output. Between 2017 and 2019, total industrial output value above designated size rose from RMB 745.91 Billion to RMB 739.65 Billion. Sector-wise, the total industrial output is divided as follows:

Automotive Industry 
Huangpu district's automotive industry achieved a total industrial output value of RMB 167.88 billion in 2019. Companies present in Huangpu include Magna, Webasto, JATCO, Honda, Xpeng Motors, Stanley Electric, and Baoneng Motor.

Electronics Industry 
Huangpu district's electronics industry achieved a total industrial output value of RMB 162.41 billion in 2019. Companies present include LG, Jabil Circuit, and Skyworth. Another notable company is Guangzhou Shiyuan Electronic Technology Company Limited, an LCD controller board supplier headquartered in Huangpu. From its founding in 2005, the LCD controller board supplier has grown to occupy over 29% of global and 61% of China's domestic market share in 2019.

Energy Industry 
Huangpu district's energy industry achieved a total industrial output value of RMB 161.44 billion in 2019, drawing mainly from high-efficiency energy-saving equipment, the product considered most competitive in Huangpu district by Deloitte. Notable companies from the energy sector in Huangpu include China Southern Power Grid, Sinopec Group, Kinfa, Guangzhou Hengyun, Guangzhou Hirp Chemical, Guangdong Yuehua Power, and Guangzhou GCL Power.

High-end Chemical Industry 
Huangpu district's high-end chemical industry achieved a total industrial output value of RMB 62.21 billion in 2019. The industry centers mostly around cosmetics, home care, fragrances, flavours, and fine chemicals. Notable companies include P&G, Amway, Colgate, and Guangzhou NipponPaint.

Food & Beverage Industry 
Huangpu district's food and beverage industry achieved a total industrial output value of RMB 57.89 billion in 2019. It is composed of high-end food, functional food, green and organic food, urban leisure food, and health food. Notable companies include Mars, Pepsi, Coca-Cola, MeadJohnson, BiosTime, Uni-President, and Yantang Dairy.

Electrical Machinery Industry 
Huangpu district's electrical machinery industry achieved a total industrial output value of RMB 22.56 billion in 2019. The industry is, for instance, processing equipment, measurement and control devices. Notable companies include Panasonic, Hitachi, Siemens, Schneider, Guangzhou Nanyang Cable, and Guangzhou Zhiguang Electric.

Emerging Industries 
Huangpu's new-generation information technology industry consists of integrated circuits, new types of display panels, intelligent terminals and other operation services for intelligent finance, big data, and service providers for telecommunication and information technology. In 2019, these sectors achieved a cumulative total industrial output of RMB 161.47 billion. Representative companies include Guangzhou CanSemi Technology, LG, Shiyuan Electronic, GRG Banking, Comba Telecom or Haige Communications.

The district is furthermore developing three foundations for future industries:

First, 5G and autonomous driving. In 2019, the district had constructed 2,500 5G base stations, two 5G intelligent factories and a demonstration district for autonomous driving utilising 5G. First trials have shown that data collection for the development of autonomous driving in Guangzhou has been much better than in Silicon Valley. While the number of cars encountered by the trial vehicle has been around the same in both places, the number of pedestrians was five times higher in Guangzhou than in Silicon Valley, and the number of cyclists four times as high. This allowed for a much richer generation of data on autonomous driving.

Second, Blockchain. According to a 2020 report by Deloitte, the district has applied blockchain technology to a variety of services, including finance, manufacturing, QC and government services.

Third, Industrial Internet.  According to the same report by Deloitte, the district is pushing the construction of national-level nodes in the “Industrial Internet Identification Resolution”. Broadly speaking, this "Industrial Internet Identification Resolution" allows for the identification of entities and virtual objects within the internet of things, and can be compared to the Domain Name System (DNS) already in use today.

Industry Clusters 
Huangpu district is home to four industry clusters. First, the China-Singapore Guangzhou Knowledge City (CSGKC) focused on knowledge-intensive economy and future industries. Second, Huangpu Lingang Economic Zone focused on service industries. Third, Guangzhou Science City focused on innovation and research and development. Fourth, Guangzhou International Biotech Island focusing on biomedicine. All of them are supported through national subsidies and preferential policies.

China-Singapore Guangzhou Knowledge City 
CSGKC, also known as "Sino-Singapore Guangzhou Knowledge City" or simply "Guangzhou Knowledge City" is focused on knowledge-intensive economy and future industries such as information technology, high-end equipment manufacturing, green economy, biomedicine, digital economy, new materials and artificial intelligence. It covers an area of 123 square kilometres. The area combines industrial development with supporting facilities, research and development institutes, residential areas and cultural attractions.

CSGKC is located around 35 km northeast of Guangzhou city centre and around 25 km from Guangzhou Baiyun International Airport. The area was started in 2010 as a greenfield master development by Sino-Singapore Guangzhou Knowledge City Investment and Development Co., Ltd., a joint venture between Singapore-based CapitaLand and the district government of Huangpu. In 2018, the initiative was elevated to a bilateral state-level cooperation project between Singapore and the People's Republic of China. Since its inception, a total of 1,803 enterprises have registered in the area by 2020, with registered capital reaching US$21.35 billion and fixed asset investment reaching around US$20.35 billion.

CSGKC is home to several companies and projects. Notable among those is for instance Guangzhou CanSemi Technology, which runs the only 12-inch wafer production line in Guangdong province in the CSGKC. Another notable project is Baidu's Apollo R&D Centre, where smart vehicles are researched and tested.

GSGKC is also home to several academic institutions. First, the Sino-Singapore International Joint Research Institute jointly set up by the CSGKC Administrative Committee, South China University of Technology, Nanyang Technological University, and Sino-Singapore Guangzhou Knowledge City Investment and Development Co., Ltd. The institute is staffed with Singaporian and Chinese professionals and focuses on the key industries of CSGKC detailed above. It engages in the research and development of new products and processes. In doing so, it cooperates with local companies and investors and incubates enterprises. Second, Huangpu Institute of the university of the Chinese Academy of Social Sciences (UCASS), which was set up in 2020.

Huangpu Lingang Economic Zone 
Huangpu Lingang Economic Zone is situated in the southern part of Huangpu district. It covers an area of 27 square kilometres of landmass and 15 square kilometres of water, and it focuses on modern service industries. Situated right at the Yangtze River, the cluster is home to coastline ports, as well as the second Guangzhou Central Business District. Its foci include port and shipping services, industrial finance, SciTech innovation, human resources, high-end and e-commerce, cultural tourism and cruise industry. It is envisioned to become an integrated service centre for international shipping and it is expected to become a key linking point for the Maritime Silk Road part of the Belt and Road Initiative.

Guangzhou Science City 
Guangzhou Science City (GSC) covers an area of 37.47 square kilometres. It focuses on high-tech industries, research and development institutions and human capital development. It is home to ISA Science City International School,  as well as companies such as Samsung, LG, Sony, Hitachi, Cedar Center, Skyworth, Baoneng, Bio-Thera, Wondfo, and Xiangxue Pharmaceutical. According to a report by Deloitte, GSC will be involved in the construction of CASICloud, Ali feilonglink and the Smart-IC of China State Shipbuilding Corporation Ltd.

Guangzhou International Biotech Island 
Guangzhou International Biotech Island (GIBI), formally known as Guanzhou Island or Dove Island, is a biomedicine cluster within Huangpu district. It forms the centre of the biotechnological industry base of Guangzhou. By 2020, around 130 pharmaceutical companies had settled on the island, among those KingMed Diagnostics or Riton-Biomaterial. In 2021, Geneseeq Technology Inc. and AstraZeneca announced their plans to establish a Bio-Diagnostic Innovation Center on the island.

The island brings together domestic and international high-end biomedicine companies and research and development centres. Among those are biotechnological research and development institutions, as well as biological service providers. A study commissioned by the German Federal Ministry for Economic Affairs and Climate Action predicts that the island will develop into a multifunctional biotechnology centre of the GBA, as it is located within the city centre of Guangzhou and well-integrated into its trade- and business systems.

Financial Institutions 
The district is home to several different financial institutions. Among these are traditional banks (such as Guangzhou Rural Commercial Bank) and venture capitalists (such as Baidu Ventures or Korea Investment Partners). Nevertheless, banks amount to the most significant number (27 in December 2020), followed by insurers (25), financial lease (22), and others (19).

Among these institutions, the Guangdong Equity Exchange is particularly noteworthy. Being the only securities exchange in Guangdong Province, companies from all across the province are listed and displayed there. At the end of November 2020, their number totalled 19,726, with total financing and trading transactions of RMB 120.707 billion.

Transportation

Metro
Huangpu is currently serviced by five lines on the Guangzhou Metro:

 - Yuzhu , Dashadi, Dashadong, Wenchong
 - Huangbei, Jinfeng, Xiangang, Suyuan , Luogang, Xiangxue
 - , Science City, Changping,

Education
Huangpu's education system is characterized primarily by its rapid growth and the expansion of universities and research projects.

Schools 
The district features a wide range of public schools, such as the Guangzhou University-affiliated middle school, which are spread over the "Huanghua Road Campus" and the "University Town Campus", as well as numerous others. Listing them would lead too far at this point, but they can be looked up under the given source.

Apart from public schools, the district also encompasses several private and international schools. Among them are for example:

 Guangzhou International Primary School ZWIE
 Guangzhou International Middle School Huangpu ZWIE (merged with Guangzhou International Primary School ZWIE in 2021 to offer consecutive 9-year education according to the International Baccalaureate standard)
 North Anglia International School Guangzhou
 American International School of Guangzhou. Its middle and high school campus is located in the Guangzhou Science City, in the former Luogang District. 
 ISA Science City International School. An International Baccalaureate candidate school, It offers education from early childhood (starting from age two) to grade 12.
 SingChina Academy. This international school opened at China-Singapore Guangzhou Knowledge City in September 2021. It is a cooperation project between Singapore and China, and it is affiliated with the Singaporean Hwa Chong family of schools. It offers a 12-year bilingual, international curriculum covering primary, middle and high school levels, integrating both Chinese and western education.

Universities 
Throughout Guangdong Province, there are a large number of universities and colleges with a wide variety of orientations, of which about 30 are in the capital city of Guangzhou. Of the universities represented in Guangzhou, some have campuses in Huangpu, such as Guangzhou University, which maintains a research campus there. Foreign universities are also represented. For instance, the University of Birmingham maintains a research centre in Huangpu District.

In addition, there are ambitions to construct several universities in Huangpu. The district's "Vision 2035" plans to build its own Huangpu University between 2021 and 2025. It also aims to form Guangzhou Jiaotong University by merging several universities. On its website, the district government further specifies that the university, when completed, should cover a total area of over 780,000 square meters and provide space for teaching and offices. It is also expected to function as a new research center.

Research Institutes 
Huangpu is home to several research institutes that support research and development in the district. Some of them are operated by Huangpu's local universities, others affiliated with universities from other cities or countries. As detailed above, Guangzhou University and the University of Birmingham both maintain research institutes in Huangpu District, whilst the China-Singapore Guangzhou Knowledge City is home to the Sino-Singapore International Joint Research Institute and the Huangpu Institute of the university of the Chinese Academy of Social Sciences.

In the future, according to the district's official website, there are plans to expand research institutions. For example, the Huangpu Research Institute of Guangzhou University has been under expansion since the end of 2021 and is expected to include its own academic exchange centre, offices and laboratories in the future. Guangdong University of Foreign Studies (GDUFS) plans to build a specific research institute in Huangpu in 2022. Both the research institute of Guangdong University and Guangzhou University are part of the comprehensive development plan of the specially launched "Science and Education Innovation Zone" (2020-2023) of CSGKC.

See also
 Changzhou
 Pazhou, the island formerly known as Huangpu ("Whampoa")

References

External links

Official website of Huangpu District government
Huangpu Dashadi
Official English Website of Huangpu District Government

 
Districts of Guangzhou